El Hadj Ismael Mohamed Gassim Gushein is a Guinean politician. He is the Secretary-General of the Democratic Party of Guinea-African Democratic Rally (PDG-RDA) and has led the party since it was re-established in 1992.

Gushein was elected to the National Assembly in the 1995 legislative election and sat on the National Assembly's Foreign Affairs Commission during the 1995–2002 parliamentary term. In the 30 June 2002 legislative election, Gushein was re-elected to the National Assembly as a PDG-RDA candidate. The party won 3.4% of the popular vote and three out of 114 seats in that election.

References

Year of birth missing (living people)
Guinean Muslims
Living people
Democratic Party of Guinea – African Democratic Rally politicians
Members of the National Assembly (Guinea)